The 2020–21 NCAA Division I men's ice hockey season began on November 14, 2020 and concluded with the Frozen Four on April 10, 2021. Due to the cancellation of the previous year's tournament due to COVID-19 pandemic, this was the 73rd season in which an NCAA ice hockey championship was held, and was US college hockey's 127th year overall.

Due to concerns related to the pandemic, the start of the season was delayed until what would have normally been the 8th week of play. Despite having to contend with contend with cancellations and delays due to the pandemic, the season was completed. Massachusetts won their first National Championship, ending the 4-year run of NCHC teams.

Polls

Regular season
Due to difficulties in scheduling, Arizona State entered into a scheduling alliance with the Big Ten while LIU did the same with Atlantic Hockey. Both teams remained independent programs and will not be considered for conference championships.

Standings

PairWise Rankings
The PairWise Rankings (PWR) are a statistical tool designed to approximate the process by which the NCAA selection committee decides which teams get at-large bids to the 16-team NCAA tournament. Although the NCAA selection committee does not use the PWR as presented by USCHO, the PWR has been accurate in predicting which teams will make the tournament field.
	
For Division I men, all teams are included in comparisons starting in the 2013–14 season (formerly, only teams with a Ratings Percentage Index of .500 or above, or teams under consideration, were included). The PWR method compares each team with every other such team, with the winner of each “comparison” earning one PWR point. After all comparisons are made, the points are totaled up and rankings listed accordingly.
	
With 61 Division I men's teams, the greatest number of PWR points any team could earn is 60, winning the comparison with every other team. Meanwhile, a team that lost all of its comparisons would have no PWR points.

Teams are then ranked by PWR point total, with ties broken by the teams’ RPI ratings, which starting in 2013-14 is weighted for home and road games and includes a quality wins bonus (QWB) for beating teams in the top 20 of the RPI (it also is weighted for home and road).
	
When it comes to comparing teams, the PWR uses three criteria which are combined to make a comparison: RPI, record against common opponents and head-to-head competition. Starting in 2013–14, the comparison of record against teams under consideration was dropped because all teams are now under comparison.

Due to the COVID-19 pandemic, most teams played a very small selection of intraconference games, if any at all. As a result, the PairWise rankings would not be used as the primary measuring tool for determining which teams would receive at-large bids for the NCAA tournament. The ranking would only be used to differentiate between teams within their own conferences. The PWR will likely be used as the primary ranking system once a full NCAA season is played.

Player stats

Scoring leaders

GP = Games played; G = Goals; A = Assists; Pts = Points; PIM = Penalty minutes

Leading goaltenders
The following goaltenders lead the NCAA in goals against average, minimum 1/3 of team's minutes played.

GP = Games played; Min = Minutes played; W = Wins; L = Losses; T = Ties; GA = Goals against; SO = Shutouts; SV% = Save percentage; GAA = Goals against average

Tournament bracket 

* denotes overtime period† Michigan and Notre Dame were removed from the tournament due to positive COVID-19 test results.

Awards

NCAA

Big Ten

Atlantic Hockey

East

West

ECAC

Hockey East

NCHC

WCHA

See also
 2020–21 NCAA Division II men's ice hockey season
 2020–21 NCAA Division III men's ice hockey season

References

 
NCAA